Ted Tully (August 8, 1930 – January 24, 2003) was a linebacker for the Edmonton Eskimos and the BC Lions from 1950 to 1962 of the Canadian Football League. He was a  West Division All-Star in 1955, 1956, 1957 and 1958, and was part of three Grey Cup championships with the Eskimos. He married a nurse named Elaine Virginia Foss, and had 4 children; one son and three daughters.

References

1930 births
2003 deaths
Canadian football linebackers
Edmonton Elks players
BC Lions players
Players of Canadian football from British Columbia
Canadian football people from Vancouver